The United Muslim Association of Hong Kong (UMAH) is a registered charity and Islamic organization in Hong Kong established to organize and manage community worship centres i.e. mosques, schools and elderly care homes for the Muslim community in Hong Kong. UMAH has commenced a new project named the Sheung Shui Mosque and Islamic Centre and elderly care home in Sheung Shui.

History
The organisation was established in 1997 by Omar Ramju Sadick.

Activities
It currently operates the UMAH International Primary School in Yen Long and a home for the elderly, Haji Omar Ramju Sadick Care and Attention Home in Tuen Mun. UMAH also manages an ongoing project to establish a new mosque named the Sheung Shui Mosque and Islamic Centre and an elderly care home in Sheung Shui.

See also
 Islam in China
 Islam in Hong Kong

References

External links
 

1997 establishments in Taiwan
Islamic organisations based in Hong Kong
Islamic organizations established in 1997